Charles Crawford Hunter (5 June 1836 – 24 January 1921) was a Scottish professional golfer and greenskeeper. He was born at Prestwick, Scotland, and died there. He was the last survivor of those who took part in the first Open Championship in 1860. Over the course of his career, Hunter had seven top-10 finishes in the Open Championship.

Early life and family
Hunter was born on 5 June 1836 in Prestwick, Scotland. Hunter's son, John, finished in eighth place in the 1898 Open Championship and also won the 1907 Scottish PGA Championship.

Golf career
Hunter had seven top-10 finishes in the Open Championship. His best performance, rounds of 60-60-58=178, put him in third place in the 1862 Open Championship.

1862 Open Championship
The 1862 Open Championship was the third Open Championship and was held at Prestwick Golf Club, Ayrshire, Scotland, the site of the first 12 Open Championship tournaments, the first of which was in 1860. Hunter played steady golf, carding rounds of 60-60-58=178, and finished in third place. Tom Morris, Sr. won the Championship, shooting rounds of 52-55-56=163, and triumphed by the large margin of 13 strokes from runner-up Willie Park, Sr.

Employed by Prestwick Golf Club
Hunter was employed by Prestwick Golf Club as 'Keeper of the Green', and assisted as well with the early formation work for  the neighbouring Royal Troon Golf Club, located just north of Prestwick, in the 1870s and 1880s.

Death and legacy
Hunter died of bronchitis in 1921 at the age of 84. He was the last survivor of those who took part in the first Open Championship in 1860.

Results in The Open Championship

Note: Hunter played only in The Open Championship.

NT = No tournament
DNP = Did not play
"T" indicates a tie for a place
Yellow background for top-10

References

Scottish male golfers
Sportspeople from South Ayrshire
People from Prestwick
1836 births
1921 deaths